The BNP Paribas Sopot Open is a professional tennis tournament played on clay courts. It is currently part of the Association of Tennis Professionals (ATP) Challenger Tour. Although due to be held annually in Sopot, Poland, it was played in nearby Gdynia in 2018 but moved to Sopot Tenis Klub in 2019.

Past finals

Singles

Doubles

References

External links
 Official website

ATP Challenger Tour
Clay court tennis tournaments
Tennis tournaments in Poland
Sopot